Mead, also called hydromel, particularly when low in alcohol content, is an alcoholic beverage made by fermenting honey mixed with water, and sometimes with added ingredients such as fruits, spices, grains, or hops. The alcoholic content ranges from about 3.5% ABV to more than 20%. The defining characteristic of mead is that the majority of the beverage's fermentable sugar is derived from honey. It may be still, carbonated, or naturally sparkling; dry, semi-sweet, or sweet.

The term honey wine is sometimes used as a synonym for mead, although wine is typically defined to be the product of fermented grapes or certain other fruits, and some cultures have honey wines that are distinct from mead. The honey wine of Hungary, for example, is the fermentation of honey-sweetened pomace of grapes or other fruits.

Mead was produced in ancient times throughout Europe, Africa, and Asia, and has played an important role in the mythology of some peoples. In Norse mythology, for example, the Mead of Poetry, crafted from the blood of Kvasir (a wise being born from the mingled spittle of the Aesir and Vanir deities) would turn anyone who drank it into a poet or scholar.

History
Mead is a drink widely considered to have been discovered prior to the advent of both agriculture and ceramic pottery in the Neolithic, due to the prevalence of naturally occurring fermentation and the distribution of eusocial honey-producing insects worldwide; as a result, it is hard to pinpoint the exact historical origin of mead given the possibility of multiple discovery or potential knowledge transfer between early humans prior to recorded history. For example, mead can be produced by flooding a bee nest, and it has been speculated that late Paleolithic African hunter-gatherers possibly discovered how to make "short" or quick meads via this method, ready to drink within a few days or weeks, as a means of making water safer to drink and pleasant to consume. With the eventual rise of ceramic pottery and increasing use of fermentation in food processing to preserve surplus agricultural crops, evidence of mead begins to show up in the archaeological record more clearly, with pottery vessels from northern China dating from at least 7000 BCE discovered containing chemical signatures consistent with the presence of honey, rice, and organic compounds associated with fermentation. In Europe, mead is first described from residual samples found in ceramics of the Bell Beaker Culture (c. 2800–1800 BCE).

The earliest surviving written record of mead is possibly the soma mentioned in the hymns of the Rigveda, one of the sacred books of the historical Vedic religion and (later) Hinduism dated around 1700–1100 BCE.
The Abri, a northern subgroup of the Taulantii, were known to the ancient Greek writers for their technique of preparing mead from honey.
Taulantii could prepare mead, wine from honey like the Abri.
During the Golden Age of ancient Greece, mead was said to be the preferred drink. Aristotle (384–322 BCE) discussed mead made in Illiria in his Meteorologica and elsewhere, while Pliny the Elder (23–79 CE) called mead militites in his Naturalis Historia and differentiated wine sweetened with honey or "honey-wine" from mead. The Hispanic-Roman naturalist Columella gave a recipe for mead in De re rustica, about 60 CE.

Ancient Greek writer Pytheas described a grain and honey drink similar to mead that he encountered while travelling in Thule. According to James Henry Ramsay this was an earlier version of Welsh metheglin. When 12-year-old Prince Charles II visited Wales in 1642 Welsh metheglin was served at the feast as a symbol of Welsh presence in the emerging British identity in the years between the Union of the Crowns in 1603 and the creation of the Kingdom of Great Britain in 1707.

The legendary drinking, feasting, and boasting of warriors in the mead hall is echoed in the mead hall Din Eidyn (modern-day Edinburgh) as depicted in the poem Y Gododdin, attributed to the poet Aneirin who would have been a contemporary of Taliesin. In the Old English epic poem Beowulf, the Danish warriors drank mead. In both Insular Celtic and Germanic poetry, mead was the primary heroic or divine drink, see Mead of poetry.

Mead (Old Irish mid) was a popular drink in medieval Ireland. Beekeeping was brought around the 5th century, traditionally attributed to Modomnoc, and mead came with it. A banquet hall on the Hill of Tara was known as Tech Mid Chuarda ("house of the circling of mead"). Mead was often infused with hazelnuts. Many other legends of saints mention mead, as does that of the Children of Lir.

Later, taxation and regulations governing the ingredients of alcoholic beverages led to commercial mead becoming a more obscure beverage until recently. Some monasteries kept up the traditions of mead-making as a by-product of beekeeping, especially in areas where grapes could not be grown.

Etymology 
The English mead – "fermented honey drink" – derives from the Old English meodu or medu, and Proto-Indo-European language, *médʰu. Its cognates include Old Norse mjǫðr, Proto-Slavic medъ, Middle Dutch mede, and Old High German metu, and the ancient Irish queen Medb, among others. The Chinese word for honey, mì (蜜) was borrowed from the extinct Indo-European Tocharian word mit – also a cognate with the English word mead.

Fermentation process
Meads will often ferment well at the same temperatures at which wine is fermented, and the yeast used in mead making is often identical to that used in wine making (particularly those used in the preparation of white wines). Many home mead makers choose to use wine yeasts to make their meads.

By measuring the specific gravity of the mead once before fermentation and throughout the fermentation process using a hydrometer or refractometer, mead makers can determine the proportion of alcohol by volume that will appear in the final product. This also serves to troubleshoot a "stuck" batch, one where the fermentation process has been halted prematurely by dormant or dried yeast.

With many different styles of mead possible, there are many different processes employed, although many producers will use techniques recognizable from wine-making. One such example is to rack the product into a second container, once fermentation slows down significantly. These are known as a primary and a secondary fermentation, respectively. Some larger commercial fermenters are designed to allow both primary and secondary fermentation to happen inside the same vessel. Racking is done for two reasons: it lets the mead sit away from the remains of the yeast cells (lees) that have died during the fermentation process. Second, this lets the mead have time to clear. Cloudiness can be caused by either yeast or suspended protein molecules. There is also the possibility that the pectin from any fruit that is used could have set which gives the mead a cloudy look. The cloudiness can be cleared up by either "cold breaking", which is leaving the mead in a cold environment overnight, or using a fining material, such as sparkolloid, bentonite, egg white, or isinglass. If the mead-maker wishes to backsweeten the product (add supplementary sweetener) or prevent it from oxidizing, potassium metabisulfite and potassium sorbate are added. After the mead clears, it is bottled and distributed.

Primary fermentation usually takes 28 to 56 days, after which the must is placed in a secondary fermentation vessel for 6 to 9 months of aging. Durations of primary and secondary fermentation producing satisfactory mead may vary considerably according to numerous factors, such as floral origin of the honey and its natural sugar and microorganism contents, must water percentage, pH, additives used, and strain of yeast, among others. Although supplementation of the must with non-nitrogen based salts, or vitamins has been tested to improve mead qualities, no evidence suggests that adding micronutrients reduced fermentation time or improved quality. Cell immobilization methods, however, proved effective for enhancing mead quality.

Varieties
Mead can have a wide range of flavors depending on the source of the honey, additives (also known as "adjuncts" or "gruit") including fruit and spices, the yeast employed during fermentation, and the aging procedure.  Some producers have erroneously marketed white wine sweetened and flavored with honey after fermentation as mead, sometimes spelling it "meade." This is closer in style to a hypocras. Blended varieties of mead may be known by the style represented; for instance, a mead made with cinnamon and apples may be referred to as either a cinnamon metheglin or an apple cyser.
 
A mead that also contains spices (such as cloves, cinnamon or nutmeg), or herbs (such as meadowsweet, hops, or even lavender or chamomile), is called a metheglin .

A mead that contains fruit (such as raspberry, blackberry or strawberry) is called a melomel, which was also used as a means of food preservation, keeping summer produce for the winter. A mead that is fermented with grape juice is called a pyment.

Mulled mead is a popular drink at Christmas time, where mead is flavored with spices (and sometimes various fruits) and warmed, traditionally by having a hot poker plunged into it.

Some meads retain some measure of the sweetness of the original honey, and some may even be considered as dessert wines.  Drier meads are also available, and some producers offer sparkling meads.

Historically, meads were fermented with wild yeasts and bacteria (as noted in the recipe quoted above) residing on the skins of the fruit or within the honey itself. Wild yeasts can produce inconsistent results. Yeast companies have isolated strains of yeast that produce consistently appealing products. Brewers, winemakers, and mead makers commonly use them for fermentation, including yeast strains identified specifically for mead fermentation. These are strains that have been selected because of their characteristic of preserving delicate honey flavors and aromas.

Mead can also be distilled to a brandy or liqueur strength, in which case it is sometimes referred to as a whiskey. A version called "honey jack" can be made by partly freezing a quantity of mead and straining the ice out of the liquid (a process known as freeze distillation), in the same way that applejack is made from cider.

Regional variants
In Finland, a sweet mead called  is connected with the Finnish Vappu festival (although in modern practice, brown sugar is often used in place of honey). During secondary fermentation, added-raisins augment the amount of sugar available to the yeast and indicate readiness for consumption, rising to the top of the bottle when sufficiently depleted. Sima is commonly served with both the pulp and rind of a lemon.

Ethiopian mead is called tej (ጠጅ) and is usually home-made. It is flavored with the powdered leaves and bark of gesho, a hop-like bittering agent which is a species of buckthorn.  A sweeter, less-alcoholic version called berz, aged for a shorter time, is also made.  The traditional vessel for drinking tej is a rounded vase-shaped container called a berele.

Mead known as iQhilika is traditionally prepared by the Xhosa of South Africa.

Mead in Poland has been part of culinary tradition for over a thousand years.

In the United States, mead is enjoying a resurgence, starting with small home meaderies and now with a number of small commercial meaderies. As mead becomes more widely available, it is seeing increased attention and exposure from the news media. This resurgence can also been seen around the world in the UK and Australia particularly with session (lower alcohol styles) some times call hydromel and Mead-Beer Hybrids also known as Braggots.

List of mead variants

 

 Acerglyn: A mead made with honey and maple syrup.
Bais: A native mead from the Mandaya and Manobo people of eastern Mindanao in the Philippines. It is made from honey and water fermented for at least five days to a month or more.
 Balché: A native Mexican version of mead.
 Bilbemel: A mead made with blueberries, blueberry juice, or sometimes used for a varietal mead that uses blueberry blossom honey.
 Black mead: A name was sometimes given to the blend of honey and blackcurrants.
 Blue mead: A type of mead where fungal spores are added during the first fermentation, lending a blue tint to the final product.
 Bochet: A mead where the honey is caramelized or burned separately before adding the water. Yields toffee, caramel, chocolate, and toasted marshmallow flavors.
 Bochetomel: A bochet-style mead that also contains fruit such as elderberries, black raspberries and blackberries.
 Braggot: Also called bracket or brackett. Originally brewed with honey and hops, later with honey and malt—with or without hops added. Welsh origin (bragawd).
 Byais: A native mead of the Mansaka people of the Philippines made by fermenting galanga roots with honey.
 Capsicumel: A mead flavored with chili peppers; the peppers may be hot or mild.
 Chouchenn: A kind of mead made in Brittany.
 Cyser: A blend of honey and apple juice fermented together; see also cider.
 Czwórniak (TSG): A Polish mead, made using three units of water for each unit of honey.
 Dandaghare: A mead from Nepal, that combines honey with Himalayan herbs and spices. It has been produced since 1972 in the city of Pokhara.
 Dwójniak (TSG): A Polish mead, made using equal amounts of water and honey.
 Gverc or medovina: Croatian mead prepared in Samobor and many other places. The word "gverc" or "gvirc' is from the German "" and refers to various spices added to mead.
 Hydromel: Name derived from the Greek hydromeli, i.e. literally "water-honey" (see also melikraton and hydromelon). It is also the French name for mead. (See also and compare with the Italian idromele and Spanish hidromiel and aguamiel, the Catalan hidromel and aiguamel, Galician augamel, and Portuguese hidromel). It is also used as a name for light or low-alcohol mead.
 Kabarawan: An extinct alcoholic drink from the Visayas Islands of the Philippines made with honey and the pounded bark of the Neolitsea villosa
 Medica/medovica: Slovenian, Croatian and Slovak variety of mead.
 Medovina: Czech, Croatian, Serbian, Montenegrin, Bulgarian, Bosnian and Slovak for mead. Commercially available in the Czech Republic, Slovakia and presumably other Central and Eastern-European countries.
 Medovukha: Eastern Slavic variant (honey-based fermented drink).
 Melomel: A type of mead that also contains fruit.
 Metheglin: Metheglin is traditional mead with herbs or spices added. Some of the most common metheglins are ginger, tea, orange peel, nutmeg, coriander, cinnamon, cloves or vanilla. Its name indicates that many metheglins were originally employed as folk medicines.
 Midus: Lithuanian for mead, made of natural bee honey and berry juice. Infused with carnation blossoms, acorns, poplar buds, juniper berries, and other herbs.  Generally, between 8% and 17% alcohol, it is also distilled to produce mead nectar or mead balsam, with some of the varieties having as much as 75% of alcohol.
 Mõdu: An Estonian traditional fermented drink with a taste of honey and an alcohol content of 4.0%
 Morat: a blend of honey and mulberries.
 Mulsum: Mulsum is not a true mead, but is unfermented honey blended with a high-alcohol wine.
 Mungitch: A party drink made in Western Australia, by Indigenous Noongar using flowers from the moodjar tree(Nuytsia floribunda)  are traditionally used to make a sweet mead-like beverage during birak (the first summer in the Indigenous Noongar calendar) the moodjar tree is a very sacred tree to the Noongar peoples.
 Myod: Traditional Russian mead, historically available in three major varieties:
 aged mead: a mixture of honey and water or berry juices, subject to a very slow (12–50 years) anaerobic fermentation in airtight vessels in a process similar to the traditional balsamic vinegar, creating a rich, complex and high-priced product.
 boiled mead: a drink closer to beer, brewed from boiled wort of diluted honey and herbs, very similar to modern medovukha.
 drinking mead: a kind of honey wine made from diluted honey by traditional fermentation.
 Omphacomel: A mead recipe that blends honey with verjuice; could therefore be considered a variety of pyment (q.v.). From the Greek omphakomeli, literally "unripe-grape-honey".
Oxymel: Another historical mead recipe, blending honey with wine vinegar. From the Greek  oxymeli, literally "vinegar-honey" (also oxymelikraton).
 Pitarrilla: Mayan drink made from a fermented mixture of wild honey, balché-tree bark and fresh water.
 Półtorak (TSG): A Polish great mead, made using two units of honey for each unit of water.
 Pyment: a melomel made from the fermentation of a blend of grapes and honey and can be considered either a grape mead or honeyed wine. Pyment made with white grapes is sometimes called "white mead". In previous centuries piment was synonymous with Hippocras, a grape wine with honey added post-fermentation.
Quick mead: A type of mead recipe that is meant to age quickly, for immediate consumption.  Because of the techniques used in its creation, short mead shares some qualities found in cider (or even light ale): primarily that it is effervescent, and often has a cidery taste. It can also be champagne-like.
 Red mead: A form of mead made with redcurrants.
 Rhodomel: made from honey, rose hips, rose petals or rose attar, and water. From the Greek  rhodomeli, literally "rose-honey".
 Rubamel: A specific type of melomel made with raspberries.
 Sack mead: This refers to a mead that is made with more honey than is typically used.  The finished product contains a higher-than-average ethanol concentration (meads at or above 14% ABV are generally considered to be of sack strength) and often retains a high specific gravity and elevated levels of sweetness, although dry sack meads (which have no residual sweetness) can be produced.  According to one theory, the name derives from the fortified dessert wine sherry (which is sometimes sweetened after fermentation) that, in England, once bore the nickname "sack". In Another theory is that the term is a phonetic reduction of "sake" the name of a Japanese beverage that was introduced to the West by Spanish and Portuguese traders.  However, this mead is quite sweet and Shakespeare referenced "sack" in Henry the V, "If sack and sugar be a fault, God help the wicked!", as well as 18th-century cookbooks that reference "sack mead" by authors unlikely to have known nor tasted "sake".
 Short mead: A mead made with less honey than usual and intended for immediate consumption.
 Show mead: A term that has come to mean "plain" mead: that which has honey and water as a base, with no fruits, spices, or extra flavorings. Because honey alone often does not provide enough nourishment for the yeast to carry on its life cycle, a mead that is devoid of fruit, etc. sometimes requires a special yeast nutrient and other enzymes to produce an acceptable finished product. In most competitions, including all those that subscribe to the BJCP style guidelines, as well as the International Mead Fest, the term "traditional mead" refers to this variety (because mead is historically a variable product, these guidelines are a recent expedient, designed to provide a common language for competition judging; style guidelines per se do not apply to commercial or historical examples of this or any other type of mead).
 Sima: a quick-fermented low-alcoholic Finnish variety, seasoned with lemon and associated with the festival of vappu.
 Tapluchʼi: a Georgian name for mead, especially made of honey but it is also a collective name for any kind of drinkable inebriants.
 Tej/mes: an Ethiopian and Eritrean mead, fermented with wild yeasts and the addition of gesho.
 Traditional mead: synonymous with "show mead," meaning it contains only honey, water, and yeast.
 Trójniak (TSG): A Polish mead, made using two units of water for each unit of honey.
 Včelovina: Slovak alternative name for mead.
 White mead: A mead that is colored white with herbs, fruit or, sometimes, egg whites.

See also
 History of alcoholic beverages
 Kilju
 Mead hall
 Sahti
 Sima

References

Further reading

 
 
 
 Minnick, Fred (2018).  Mead: The Libations, Legends and Lore.  Running Press, Philadelphia.  .
 
Zaerpoor, Chrissie Manion (2017).  The Art of Mead Tasting and Food Pairing.  Mead Maven Publishing, Yamhill, Oregon.  .

 
Germanic paganism
History of alcoholic drinks
Cuisine of Northern Ireland
Scottish cuisine
Welsh cuisine
Early Germanic cuisine
Entheogens
Norwegian cuisine
Swedish alcoholic drinks
Danish cuisine
Icelandic cuisine
Finnish cuisine
Estonian cuisine
Honey-based beverages